Redpine Signals is a fabless semiconductor company that started its operation in 2001. The company makes chipsets and system-level products for wireless networks. It serves the Internet of Things and wireless embedded systems market, enabling all volume levels of chipsets and modules.

In 2005, Redpine Signals developed a low power 802.11 b/g chipset, which it licensed to a semiconductor company for use in its product or SoC as a wireless interface.
The company established a single stream 802.11n Wi-Fi product in 2007 for handheld devices.
In 2012, Redpine Signals developed a simultaneous dual-band Wi-Fi 11n/BT 4.0 + 5 GHz MIMO 11ac convergence SoC for smartphones and tablets.
The company also introduced a simultaneous dual-band 450 Mbit/s 3x3 802.11n chipset for digital home and enterprise applications.

In 2020, its connectivity business, including Wi-Fi and Bluetooth products, its development center in Hyderabad, and patent portfolio, was acquired by Silicon Labs.

Products and services

Redpine Signals' products include single stream 802.11abgn chipsets and modules, and system products for Wi-Fi based Real-Time Locating Systems (RTLS). The company also offers 'Wi-Fi Starter Kits' that include Redpine Wi-Fi Interface cards integrated with microcontroller development kits from partnership companies.

There is an open-source device driver mainlined in the Linux kernel for some rsi91x hardware that uses the mac80211 framework. Other drivers are documented in Comparison of open-source wireless drivers.

The company offers a comprehensive Internet of Things IoT platform that includes hardware boards, application development environment, cloud software and services framework as well as a product synthesis solution for synthesizing the final product. The platform significantly reduces the time it takes to develop and bring to market new IoT devices by providing integrated sensing, computing, communication, power management, cloud and application support.

References

External links
Redpine Signals Home Page
Redpine champions 5GHz WiFi for M2M
RedPine Signals Intros Dual-Frequency Wi-Fi RFID Tag
Frost & Sullivan Presented the 2012 Growth, Innovation & Leadership Awards
Red Herring Americas 2012 Top 100
Rutronik introduces Redpine Signals‘ new 5 GHz Wi-Fi RTLS tags
Redpine Signals Introduces Industry’s First 5 GHz Wi-Fi RTLS Tags
Ascom i62 VoWiFi delivers longer battery life, enhances enterprise productivity
Migrating to the 5 GHz Wi-Fi Band Will Advance RTLS and M2M Communications
Why Wi-Fi for the Internet of Things will move to 5 GHz
Brainstorm: M2M Communications
M2M Communications with Wi-Fi in the 5 GHz Band
Redpine Signals Unveils WiSeConnect
Televic Selects Redpine Signals Wi-Fi Technology for the Next Generation of its Confidea® Audio Conferencing Solution

Semiconductor companies of the United States
Chipsets